Dick M. Kelly (born March 14, 1941) is an American former politician. He served in the South Dakota Senate from 2002 to 2006.

References

1941 births
Living people
Politicians from Saint Paul, Minnesota
Politicians from Sioux Falls, South Dakota
Businesspeople from Minnesota
Businesspeople from South Dakota
Republican Party South Dakota state senators